Music Without Musicians – music boxes and juke boxes was an exposition in Hořovice Castle in the Central Bohemian Region, Czech Republic. It was dedicated to music instruments that need no musicians to produce music.

Collection
The exposition showed a collection of mechanical music instruments from the 18th, 19th and 20th century. The collection consisted of jukeboxes, music boxes, mechanical paintings (tableaux animés), barrel organs, polyphons, orchestrions and more different instruments.

Background
The exposition was situated in the former castle kitchen of Hořovice Castle. It was part of the Czech Music Museum at Prague that provided the collection to the museum.

See also
List of museums in the Czech Republic
List of music museums

References

Music museums in the Czech Republic
Museums in the Central Bohemian Region
Musical instrument museums